The Tug of War Indoor World Championships is a tug of war competition organised by the Tug of War International Federation for national teams. It is one of the two main worldwide competitions in the sport and has been held biennially since 2014. TWIF also organizes the TWIF Outdoor World Championships for nations.

Venues

Medallists

Men's 560kg

Men's 600kg

Men's 640kg

Men's 680kg

Women's 500kg

Women's 540kg

Mixed 580kg

Mixed 600kg

References

 
 
 
 
 

Recurring sporting events established in 2014